Route 11 Business or Highway 11 Business may refer to:
 U.S. Route 11 Business
 North Carolina Highway 11 Business

See also
List of highways numbered 11
List of highways numbered 11 Bypass
List of highways numbered 11A
List of highways numbered 11B
List of highways numbered 11C